The Hammetschwand Lift is the highest exterior elevator in Europe and is located in Switzerland. It connects a rock path with the lookout point Hammetschwand on the Bürgenstock plateau overlooking Lake Lucerne.

History
Built by hotel and railway businessman Franz Josef Bucher, it was the first of its type in Switzerland when first opened in 1905. The lift carries passengers  up to the summit of the Hammetschwand in under a minute, and holds the record for the highest exterior lift in Europe. The current lift was built and opened by the Schindler Group.

At this time it was not only the highest public external elevator in Europe, but also the fastest elevator in the world. 

The elevator entrance, the engine room and the first  of the pit are within the mountain, while the next  of the shaft extend into the open air, offering a view of Lake Lucerne. At the top station of Hammetschwand ( above sea level), there are panoramic views of the lake and the Alps.

External links
 
 http://www.skyscraperpage.com/cities/?buildingID=47238

Individual elevators
Monuments and memorials in Switzerland